Şanlı is a Turkish word often used as a surname. Notable people with the surname include:

 Koray Şanlı, Turkish footballer
 Sertaç Şanlı, Turkish basketball player
 Tuncay Şanlı, Turkish footballer

See also
 Şanlı, Silvan

Turkish-language surnames